Estadio Alfonso Colmán is a multi-use stadium in Fernando de la Mora, Paraguay.  It is currently used mostly for football matches and is the home stadium of Club Sport Colombia of the Primera División de Paraguay.  The stadium holds 7,000 spectators

External links
Stadium information

Alfonso Colman
Alfonso Colman
Central Department
Sports venues completed in 1987